Fyodor Apollonovich Pirotsky or Fedir Apollonovych Pirotskyy (-) was a Ukrainian engineer and inventor of the world's first railway electrification system and electric tram who lived in the Russian Empire. While the commercialization of his inventions in the Russian Empire  was relatively slow, Pirotsky is known to have met with Carl Heinrich von Siemens and influenced Siemens' eventual introduction of the first regular electric tram line (for the Berlin Straßenbahn).

Biography
Pirotsky was born into the family of a military physician in Lokhvytsia Uezd of Poltava Gubernia, Ukraine (which at that time was part of the Russian Empire). His family was of Ukrainian Cossack ancestry.

Pirotsky received his education at Saint Petersburg, where he graduated from the Konstantin Cadet Corps (Konstantinovskiy Kadetskiy Korpus) and Mikhail Artillery School in 1866, and served in Kyiv with the Fortress Artillery. While stationed in Kyiv Pirotsky became a friend of the famous Russian electrical engineer Pavel Yablochkov and an enthusiast for applications of electrical energy.

Work
In 1871, Pirotsky moved back to Saint Petersburg, where among other things he proposed a new type of blast furnace. In 1874, he started experiments on Volkov Field in Saint Petersburg, and in 1875 put electrically powered railway cars on the Sestroretsks railway Miller's line (not far from the station Miller's pier). The electricity was transferred over a distance of approximately one kilometer. In his design, rails were connected to a Gramme generator. Both rails were isolated from the ground, one rail served as a direct conductor and one as a reverse conductor.

In 1880, he modified a city two-decker horse tramway to be powered by electricity instead of horses, and on  the unusual form of public transport started to serve residents of Saint Petersburg amid the vocal protests of the owners of the horsecars. The experiments continued until the end of September 1880. Some historians claim that this was the first electric tram in the world. Pirotsky did not have the money to continue his experiments, but his works stirred interest in electric trams around the world. Among people who met Pirotsky was Carl Heinrich von Siemens who was very interested and asked many questions. In 1881, the brothers Siemens started producing their own design of electric trams commercially. The first permanent electric tram line using Siemens tram cars was opened in Berlin in 1881 and the first permanent tram line in the Russian Empire was opened in Kyiv in 1892.
As often happens with talented people, Pirocki was underestimated during his lifetime. Despite his famous inventions, he was sent to the Ivangorod Fortress, where in 1888 he was dismissed early with the rank of colonel. All this happened about five months before the end of 25 years of military service, which allowed him to receive the maximum pension.

Pirotsky continued to serve as an artillery officer of the Imperial Russian Army. Among other things, he installed the first underground electric cable in Saint Petersburg to transfer electricity from a cannon foundry to the Artillery School (1881). He also was the author of a project for centralizing the city's electricity production using underground cables, he proposed new constructions of blast furnaces and bakery ovens. In 1888, he retired with the rank of colonel, lived on his military pension in the town of Oleshky (currently in Kherson Oblast, Ukraine) and died in 1898. Since no money was found on him when he died, the burial was paid for by a credit secured by the colonel's furniture.

Sources
Belkind L. D., Konfederatov I. Ya., Shneyberg Ya. A. (Белькинд Л. Д., Конфедератов И. Я., Шнейберг Я. А.), История техники, М.— Л. (History of Engineering, Moscow-Leningrad), 1956 .

References

1845 births
1898 deaths
People from Poltava Oblast
People from Poltava Governorate
Engineers from the Russian Empire
Inventors from the Russian Empire
People from the Russian Empire in rail transport
Sustainable transport pioneers
19th-century military personnel from the Russian Empire